Playing the Fool - The Official Live is a live album by British progressive rock band Gentle Giant which was released in 1977. The album contains versions of songs from all of the band's studio albums to that point except for Acquiring the Taste (although a section from the title track of that album is featured in "Excerpts from Octopus"). The original UK LP came with a 12-page booklet that has not been reproduced in any of the CD editions.

Track listing

35th anniversary re-release edition

The track listing and times differ depending on the specific release.

Personnel
Gentle Giant
Gary Green – electric and acoustic 6- and 12-string guitars, backing vocals, alto and soprano recorders, percussion
Kerry Minnear – electric piano, backing vocals, clavinet, Hammond organ, Moog synthesizer, cello, vibes, tenor recorder, percussion
Derek Shulman – lead vocals, alto saxophone, soprano recorder, bass, percussion
Ray Shulman – bass, backing vocals, violin, acoustic guitar, soprano recorder, trumpet, percussion
John Weathers – drums, backing vocals, vibes, tambourine, percussion

Charts

References
The Rough Guide to Rock (2nd ed.). Rough Guides Ltd. 1999. p. 424.
https://www.allmusic.com/album/playing-the-fool-the-official-live-mw0000201185

Gentle Giant albums
1977 live albums
Live progressive rock albums
Chrysalis Records live albums
Capitol Records live albums